Zulfiya may refer to:

Zulfiya Chinshanlo (born 1993), Kazakh weightlifter
Zulfiya Zabirova (born 1973), Russian professional cycle racer 
Zulfiya Isroilova (born 1915), Uzbek poet
Zulfiya Abdiqadir (born 1966), Uyghur civil servant in the People's Republic of China